Paul Mignot (born October 19, 1980) is a French film director and producer.

He graduated in 2002 from the Institut International de l'Image et du Son.

Although Paul Mignot is the son of a picture-framer and the grandson of a master glassmaker, he quickly moved towards working with the camera in feature film (36, Quai des Orfèvres, Les Fils du Vent...) before moving fully into directing commercials in 2005. His career has seen him work with such prestigious brands as Nintendo, Salvatore Ferragamo, the Bolloré group and Emporio Armani ... as well as collaborate with Nicole Kidman, Alexandra Lamy, Line Renaud, Michèle Laroque and Didier Drogba, amongst others... Working increasingly abroad, he has moved towards an impressionistic and humanist cinema.

In 2010, he authored the Mood Collection, a series of four shorts which he produced with his company, Greenlightfilms.

He directed a short movie in 2015 titled "believe". 
It's a narrative short located in Argentina, Chile, India and United States. Filmed for three years, Believe is a collection of superb photographs that lets us glimpse the beauty of our planet, beyond wars and clichés. As Paul Mignot wants, it shows both the beauty and the difficulty of being a human. Making choices, not disappointing your family, blossoming through your passions, all these major themes are tackled with brio and delicacy. 

He is also co-producer of two feature films, Night Fare by Julien Seri, and Hostile by Mathieu Turi.

He cofounded the society Frames dealer.

In 2019, he directed another short movie "All Blood runs red".

He directs his first feature film in 2022, "Vaincre ou Mourir", in collaboration with Vincent Mottez on an original idea by Nicolas de Villiers, President of Puy du Fou. This original creation will be distributed by Studiocanal and the Canal+ group channels from 2023.

External links

 
Mood-collection
His work
Interview with Paul Mignot

Living people
1980 births
French film directors
French film producers
Place of birth missing (living people)